Cemil Cahit Toydemir (1883 – July 15, 1956) was an officer of the Ottoman Army and a general of the Turkish Army of Circassian origin. He served in Caucasus front in WWI, after Armistice of Mudros he joined Turkish National Movement and attended Sivas Congress.

Meeting with Adolf Hitler 
In 1943 Adolf Hitler invited Turkish government to an official visit. Army General Toydemir had been assigned by President İnönü to visit Nazi Germany in an official trip. He had visited Atlantic Wall and Eastern Front. He examined Tiger I tanks with Turkish officers just before Operation Citadel and shared a Cigar with Erich von Manstein. During this trip he noticed Hitler Youth members below the age of eighteen were in uniform. He meet Adolf Hitler, Wilhelm Keitel and Alfred Jodl, and during the meeting Hitler stated that Turks being the first ones to defy postwar treaties inspired their movement and compared the well-preparedness of Atlantic wall to Çatalca line (Çatalca line was built to stop any probable German invasion.). 
Hitler also claimed if they did not started Operation Barbarossa in 1940 Soviet Union would have invaded Europe. Hitler ended the meeting with a prediction that in the future it will only take two hours to fly from Moscow to Berlin.
After he came back to Turkey, General Toydemir wrote a report to President İnönü about Germany's military situation. He came to a conclusion that Germany would lose the war.

See also
List of high-ranking commanders of the Turkish War of Independence
List of Commanders of the First Army of Turkey
List of General Commanders of the Gendarmerie of Turkey
List of Ministers of National Defence of Turkey

Sources

External links

1883 births
1956 deaths
Military personnel from Istanbul
Turkish people of Ubykh descent
Republican People's Party (Turkey) politicians
Ministers of National Defence of Turkey
Deputies of Istanbul
Ottoman Military Academy alumni
Ottoman Army officers
Turkish Army generals
Commanders of the First Army of Turkey
General Commanders of the Gendarmerie of Turkey
Ottoman military personnel of the Italo-Turkish War
Ottoman military personnel of the Balkan Wars
Ottoman military personnel of World War I
Turkish military personnel of the Greco-Turkish War (1919–1922)
Recipients of the Medal of Independence with Red Ribbon (Turkey)
Burials at Turkish State Cemetery
Turkish people of Circassian descent